Tur or Toor in Iran, may refer to:
 Tur, Markazi
 Tur, South Khorasan